Cul-De-Sac is the debut studio album by Decatur, IL alternative metal band V Shape Mind. The album was released on September 9, 2003 through Republic Records/Universal Records.

Its first and only single, "Monsters," features vocals by Chad Gray of Mudvayne, who happened to be best friends with lead singer Brad Hursh. "Monsters" made its local radio debut late in the summer of 2003 and found moderate airplay throughout the remainder of the year, thanks to local radio station play. V Shape Mind  toured with Powerman 5000 and the aforementioned Mudvayne, under a "radio station mini tour" in promotion of their debut. However, Cul-De-Sac proved to be the band's only studio album before disbanding in May 2004 due to being shafted by their label.

Track listing

Chart positions

Credits

Musicians 
 Brad Hursh – vocals, guitar
 Jeff McElyea – guitar, piano
 Vic Zientara – bass guitar, backing vocals
 Scott Parjani – drums
 Tim Montgomery - drums
 Torsten Hursh - keyboard, guitar, backing vocals

Album production 
 All songs written by Brad Hursh
 Produced, engineered, and mixed by David Bottrill
 Assistant engineering by Misha Rajaratnam at Armoury Studios and Gord Sran at Greenhouse Studios
 Mastered by George Marino at Sterling Sound

References 

2003 debut albums
Universal Records albums
V Shape Mind albums
Albums produced by David Bottrill